Aleko Yordan (Alekos Iordanou) (10 January 1938 – 21 September 2019) was a Turkish professional footballer who played as a center back and a later manager.

Club career
Yordan from a very young age he showed his talent and played football in Prasina Poulia, where he was noticed by Kleanthis Maropoulos, who also played in the Messinian team. At the age of 17, he was transferred to the Beyoğlu. In 1959 signed a professional contract with Beykoz in the newly founded Turkish Süper Lig. He remained in Beykoz for three seasons, until he returned to Greece to play for AEK Athens, the continuation of Pera Club for the old Constantinopolitans. At the same time, he had very tempting offers from Fenerbahçe and Galatasaray, but the only thing in the mind of the Yordan was returning to Greece to wear the yellow-black.

He agreed to sign for AEK in 1962 despite the ban from the HFF, as at that time it was forbidden for a professional footballer to compete in the first division, he was forced to wait for the appeals and legal disputes to end. It was once again Maropoulos who did everything possible for this great footballer to play in the team. Yordan adapted immediately, put in some terrific performances at AEK, attracted the interest of Bayern Munich, which asked AEK for signing him. AEK's demands were exorbitant, they rejected the Germans twice and it did the same with Beşiktaş in 1965. Yordan did not want to return to Turkey, in 1968 he again refused a transfer to Beşiktaş, even though he was already 30 years old, he wanted to continue playing for AEK. With AEK, being one of their key players, he won 2 Championships. 2 Greek Cups and was a member of the squad that reached the Balkans Cup final in 1967, as well as the quarter-finals of the European Cup in 1969.

He left at the behest of Branko Stanković in the summer of 1969 as part of the Yugoslavian manager's radical overhaul, moving at the age of 32 to Egaleo, which he led to a stunning 4th place finish in the league in 1971. He ended his huge career competing in the lower divisions of Greece, with the complaint that he did not play for national team.

International career
Yordan was called up to the Turkey at the age of 18, where he played 3 times, despite the hostile atmosphere and the stares from his teammates. The Italian coach of the Turks, however, did not listen to anything and wanted the Greek in the team at all costs alongside Lefter Küçükandonyadis.

Managerial career
Yordan took over as player-coach of Fokikos, where he won three local cups. He then took over as coach of Asteras Itea, where he had settled permanently, even after the end of his football career.

Personal life
After Yordan retired from football, he lived in Itea, Phocis with his family. He had a son named Diamantis, who was also a footballer. On 21 September 2019, he died after a long battle with cancer.

Honours

AEK Athens
Alpha Ethniki: 1962–63, 1967–68
Greek Cup: 1955–56, 1963–64, 1965–66

Fokikos
Phthiotis FCA League: 1973–74, 1975–76
Phthiotis FCA Cup: 1974–75, 1975–76, 1976–77

References

External links

1938 births
2019 deaths
Deaths from cancer in Greece
Constantinopolitan Greeks
Footballers from Istanbul
Turkish footballers
Turkey international footballers
Turkey B international footballers
Turkish people of Greek descent
Association football defenders
Beyoğlu SK footballers
Beykozspor footballers
AEK Athens F.C. players
Egaleo F.C. players
Koropi F.C. players
Fokikos A.C. players
Süper Lig players
Super League Greece players
Football League (Greece) players
Greek football managers
Fokikos F.C. managers